Paydirt is a 2020 American crime thriller film written and directed by Christian Sesma and starring Luke Goss and Val Kilmer.

Plot
Criminal gang leader Damien Brooks is recently out on parole. He was caught during a drug bust gone awry ten years ago. He reconnects with his old crew to find the cash they stole and buried as a result of that DEA bust. However, they are being monitored by Sheriff Tucker, a retired officer who knows that Damien and the gang are still up to no good. The retired sheriff tails the gang as they embark on a search for their loot in the desert.

Cast
Luke Goss as Damien Brooks
Val Kilmer as Sheriff Tucker
Mike Hatton as Geoff Bentley
Paul Sloan as Tony Brooks
Nick Vallelonga as Leo Cap
Mercedes Kilmer as Jamie
Mirtha Michelle as Layla
Mara Fimbres as Olivia
V. Bozeman as Cici

Release
The film was released in theaters and on VOD and digital platforms on August 7, 2020.

Reception
The film has  rating on Rotten Tomatoes.  Anthony Ray Bench of Film Threat gave the film a 7 out of 10.  Jeffrey M. Anderson of Common Sense Media awarded the film one star out of five.

Joe Leydon of Variety gave the film a negative review and wrote, "Christian Sesma’s derivative crime drama offers modest diversion for undemanding genre aficionados."

References

External links
 
 

2020 films
American crime thriller films
2020 crime thriller films
2020s English-language films
2020s American films